Aleksandr Sergeyevich Popov (born 23 June 1971) is a former Russian professional football player.

Club career
He played in the Russian Football National League for FC Lokomotiv Chita in 2002.

Honours
 Russian Second Division Zone East top scorer: 2000 (13 goals).

References

1971 births
Living people
Soviet footballers
Russian footballers
Association football midfielders
FC Zvezda Irkutsk players
FC Tekstilshchik Ivanovo players
FC Chita players